Lechovitch (Yiddish: לעכוויטש) is a Lithuanian Hasidic dynasty, originating from the city of Lyakhavichy, Belarus, where it was founded by Rabbi Mordechai Jaffe (ca. 1742 - 1810). Lechovitch is a branch of Karlin Hasidism as Rabbi Mordechai Jaffe was a leading disciple of Rabbi Shlomo of Karlin. The Slonim, Koidanov, and Kobrin dynasties derive from Lechovitch Hasidism.

History 
Lechovitch Hasidism was founded in 1772 by Mordechai Jaffe , a disciple of Aharon Perlow of Karlin and Shlomo HaLevi of Karlin . After Shlomo HaLevi's death in 1792, Jaffe succeeded him as rebbe. Following Jaffe's death in 1810 he was succeeded by his son, Noach Jaffe , who was the Lechovitcher rebbe until his death in 1832 after which the community split between the followers of his son-in-law Mordechai Malovitzky and his nephew and student Shlomo Chaim Perlow, who founded the Koidanov Hasidic dynasty. The last Lechovitcher rebbe was Yochanan Malovitzky who was killed in the Holocaust. His uncle, Pinchas Betzalel was the son-in-law of the Slonimer rebbe, Shmuel Weinberg, and established a branch of Lechovitch Hasidism in the United States and was succeeded by his grandson, Yehoshua Malovitzky (1923 - 1987).

Lineage 

Grand Rabbi Mordechai Jaffe (ca. 1742 - 1810), 1st Lechovitcher Rebbe 
Grand Rabbi Noach Jaffe (died 1832), 2nd Lechovitcher Rebbe 
Grand Rabbi Mordechai Malovitzky (maternal grandson of R. Shlomo HaLevi of Karlin), 3rd Lechovitcher Rebbe - son-in-law of R. Noach. 
Grand Rabbi Aharon Malovitzky (died 1851), fourth Lechovitcher Rebbe - grandson-in-law of R. Zev Wolf of Zhitomyr
Grand Rabbi Noach Malovitzky (died 1920), fifth Lechovitcher Rebbe
 Grand Rabbi Yochanan Malovitzky (1902 - 1942), sixth Lechovitcher Rebbe
Grand Rabbi Pinchas Betzalel Malovitzky (1870 - 1948), Slonim-Lechovitcher Rebbe - son-in-law of Grand Rabbi Shmuel Weinberg of Slonim
Rabbi Avraham Aaron Malovitzky (1890 - 1942)
Grand Rabbi Yehoshua Malovitzky (1923 - 1987), Slonim-Lechovitcher Rebbe - son-in-law of Grand Rabbi Yaakov Halberstam, Tshakover Rebbe
Rabbi Shlomo Pinchas Malovitzky (b. 1949), Av Beis Din of Slonim-Monsey. 
Rabbi Chaim Malovicki of Williamsburg (b. 1951)
 Rabbi Aharon Jaffe of Lechovitch (d. 1807) - Son-in-law of Grand Rabbi Asher Perlow of Karlin-Stolin
 Grand Rabbi Solomon Haim Perlow, 1st Koidanover Rebbe - Adopted his mother's maiden name. 
Grand Rabbi Baruch Mordecai Perlow (1818 - 1870), 2nd Koidanover Rebbe 
Grand Rabbi Aaron Perlow (1839 - 1897), 3rd Koidanover Rebbe 
Grand Rabbi Joseph Perlow (1853 - 1915), 4th Koidanover Rebbe 
Grand Rabbi Yaakov Yitzchak  Perlow (1903 - 1919), 5th Koidanover Rebbe
Grand Rabbi Nehemiah Perlow (1860 - 1927), 6th Koidanover Rebbe
Grand Rabbi Shalom Alter Perlow (1904 - 1940), 7th Koidanover Rebbe 
Grand Rabbi Meshullam Zalman Joseph Zilberfarb (1870 - 1944), 8th Koidanover Rebbe - son-in-law of R. Aaron
Grand Rabbi Chanoch Henoch Dov Zilberfarb (1890-1978), 9th Koidanover Rebbe of Tel Aviv 
Grand Rabbi Aharon Zilberfarb (d. 1994), 10th Koidanover Rebbe
Grand Rabbi Yaakov Tzvi Meir Ehrlich, 11th Koidanover Rebbe - Grandson of R. Chanoch Henoch
Grand Rabbi Moshe Aaron Levin (1780 - 1846), Amdurer Rebbe - son-in-law of R. Mordechai
Grand Rabbi Boruch Chaim Levin (1804 - 1867) - son-in-law of Grand Rabbi Moshe Polier of Kobrin.

See also 
 Jaffe family
 Koidanov Hasidic dynasty

References 

Karlin-Stolin (Hasidic dynasty)
Hasidic dynasties
Hasidic dynasties of Lithuania
Lyakhavichy
Judaism in Belarus
People from Lyakhavichy District
Hasidic Judaism in Belarus
Jewish groups in Belarus